Events in 1972 in Japanese television.

Events
April 1 - UHB launches

Debuts

Ongoings
Music Fair, music (1964-present)
Key Hunter, drama (1968–1973)
Mito Kōmon, jidaigeki (1969-2011)
Sazae-san, anime (1969-present)
Ōedo Sōsamō, jidaigeki (1970-1984)
Ōoka Echizen, jidaigeki (1970-1999)
Kamen Rider, tokusatsu (1971–1973)
Star Tanjō!, talent (1971-1983)

Endings

See also
1972 in anime
1972 in Japan
List of Japanese films of 1972

References